Alexander Cairns may refer to:
 Alexander Cairns (cricketer)
 Alexander Cairns (rugby union)

See also
 Alex Cairns, English footballer 
 Alexander Cairnes, Irish politician and banker